Robert Hutchins Jeffrey (December 21, 1873 – October 22, 1961) was the 35th mayor of Columbus, Ohio and the 32nd person to serve in that office.  He was elected April 4, 1903.  He served Columbus for one term and an additional eight months.  The Ohio General Assembly changed Ohio election times from the spring season to the fall season during his tenure in office.  His successor, De Witt C. Badger, took office on January 1, 1906.  He died on October 22, 1961.

References

Bibliography

Further reading

External links

Robert Hutchins Jeffrey at Political Graveyard

Mayors of Columbus, Ohio
1873 births
1961 deaths
Ohio Republicans
Williams College alumni
Burials at Green Lawn Cemetery (Columbus, Ohio)